Torrington Place is a street in London that runs between Tottenham Court Road in the West and Byng Place in the East. It is crossed by Huntley Street and Gower Street. Chenies Mews joins it on the north side and is continued by Ridgmount Gardens on the south side.

Until 1938, the part of Torrington Place between Tottenham Court Road and Gower Street was known as Francis Street and only the part from Gower Street to Malet Street was known as Torrington Place.

References

Streets in the London Borough of Camden